Serenade is the ninth studio album by Neil Diamond, released in 1974. It was his second album for Columbia Records. 

Three singles were lifted from the album: "Longfellow Serenade" (#5), "I've Been This Way Before" (#34) and "The Last Picasso". Serenade was Diamond's third consecutive platinum album. It was also issued as a quadraphonic LP with some songs as alternate takes.

Production
"I've Been This Way Before" was originally meant to be the closing number on Jonathan Livingston Seagull, but Diamond was unable to finish it in time. Serenade was the last album for which Diamond solely wrote all the songs until 2001's Three Chord Opera.

Critical reception
The Morning Call wrote that the songs "seemed overblown, self-important and banal - pale imitations . . . rewrites, if you will, of songs Diamond already had recorded," and praised Beautiful Noise as a righting of the ship.

Record World said of the single release of "The Last Picasso" that the "new mix brings to the album cut undeniably colorful AM hit strokes while none of its subtler appeal is brushed aside."

Track listing
All tracks written by Neil Diamond.

Personnel
Neil Diamond - vocals, guitar
Richard Bennett - guitar
Emory Gordy, Jr. - bass guitar
Alan Lindgren, David Paich - keyboards
Dennis St. John - drums
Jimmie Haskell - arranger, conductor

Chart positions

Year-end charts

Certifications

References

1974 albums
Neil Diamond albums
Columbia Records albums
Albums conducted by Jimmie Haskell
Albums arranged by Jimmie Haskell
Albums produced by Tom Catalano